is the second compilation album by Japanese entertainer Miho Nakayama. Released through King Records on March 20, 1989, the album features 12 ballads selected by Nakayama from her past releases, plus new recordings of "Sentimental Tsūshin", "Kabin", and "Try or Cry". The album was reissued on December 18, 1996, as Ballads I with a different cover to match that of Ballads II.

The album peaked at No. 2 on Oricon's albums chart and sold over 195,000 copies. It was also certified Gold by the RIAJ.

Track listing

Charts

Certification

References

External links
 
 
 

1989 compilation albums
Miho Nakayama compilation albums
Japanese-language compilation albums
King Records (Japan) compilation albums